Notiothemis is a genus of dragonflies in the family Libellulidae. They are commonly known as Forestwatchers.

Species
The genus contains only two species:

References

Libellulidae
Anisoptera genera
Taxa named by Friedrich Ris
Taxonomy articles created by Polbot